Oblivion! is the fifth extended play by British indie rock band Sundara Karma. The EP was released on 1 April 2022 through Chess Club Records. It is the band's second EP that was produced by Clarence Clarity, after the first being their 2020 EP, Kill Me.

Style and composition
Oblivion! stylistically has a combination of future pop, pop rock and '00s emo sounds. Frontman Oscar Pollock said he "wanted to take pop rock to a maximalist and super saccharine place" for the EP's production. During the making, he had been revisiting music from around 2003 and felt nostalgic about it at the time. Both Oblivion! and Kill Me were done in the same headspace Pollock was in that he described them as "siblings".

Track listing

References 

2022 EPs
Sundara Karma EPs